Robert Stubbs (born 4 April 1939) is a Canadian rower. He competed in the men's double sculls event at the 1968 Summer Olympics.

References

1939 births
Living people
Canadian male rowers
Olympic rowers of Canada
Rowers at the 1968 Summer Olympics
People from Ormskirk